Edrington (legally The Edrington Group Ltd.) is a privately owned international spirits company based in Glasgow, Scotland. It produces single malts The Macallan, Highland Park, The Glenrothes, Naked Malt and The Famous Grouse blended Scotch whisky. The spirits portfolio also includes Noble Oak Bourbon of Independence, Kentucky, and Brugal, the leading golden rum in the Caribbean. It also owns shares in Wyoming Whiskey, an American whiskey made in Kirby, Wyoming, and No.3 London Dry Gin.

Based in Glasgow, it employs approximately 2,500 people in its wholly owned and joint venture businesses around the world. Approximately 1000 employees are based in Scotland. Approximately 60% of the workforce is outside Scotland.

History
1861: Founding of Robertson & Baxter

William A. Robertson began in business in the city of Glasgow in 1850, forming Robertson & Baxter in 1861. In 1885 the company took a share holding in the North British Distillery Company. In 1887 the company became part of a group that founded Highland Distilllers, with William Robertson serving as its first chairman. When William Roberstson died in 1893, his oldest son, James, became chairman.

1961: Creation of Edrington and The Robertson Trust

The Robertson sisters (Elspeth, Agnes and Ethel) inherited the Scotch whisky interests founded and developed by their grandfather and father. Keen to ensure the independence of the company, the welfare of its employees and to continue their tradition of supporting good causes in Scotland, in 1961 the sisters created The Edrington Group (named after a farm near their home in the Scottish Borders) to hold their business interests. At the same time, they also established The Robertson Trust, a registered charity under Scottish law, which owns all voting shares in Edrington. The Robertson Trust is now Scotland's largest independent grant-making charitable trust, and is funded by the dividend income of its shares in Edrington.

By 2022, the Trust had donated more than £322 million to charities in Scotland since its inception and given financial support to young people from deprived backgrounds who are attending higher education.

In 1999 Edrington acquired Highland Distillieres through a partnership with William Grant & Sons taking a minority interest (the 1887 Company).

21st Century 

In the New Year Honours 2008, former chairman, John James Griffin Good, was made a Knight Bachelor "for services to Scotland".

Since 2008, Edrington has increased the international nature of its business through the acquisition of brands and sales and distribution companies in key markets. Its brands are distributed across the world by a network of wholly owned companies, joint venture companies and third party distributors.

In February 2008 the company bought a majority shareholding in Brugal of the Dominican Republic, the leading golden rum in the Caribbean.

In April 2010 Edrington acquired Cutty Sark blended Scotch whisky brand from long-standing trading partner Berry Bros. & Rudd.

In 2014 Edrington moved its Asia headquarters from Hong Kong to Singapore and created a new regional hub for Asia – Edrington Asia Pacific.

In April 2014, Edrington ended its relationship with Rémy Cointreau in the United States, and created its own distribution company – Edrington Americas

in 2015, Edrington Global Travel Retail was created. It is based in the company's Asia Pacific Headquarters in Singapore.

In 2016 Edrington acquired a minority stake in Tequila Partida. It sold its stake to Lucas Bols in 2021.

In 2018 Edrington Americas took a minority stake in Wyoming Whiskey, an American whiskey.

In 2018 Edrington sold Cutty Sark to La Martiniquaise, a privately owned spirits company based in France.

In March 2019 Edrington sold 95% of the Glenturret distillery to the Swiss Lalique Group with private investors holding the remaining shares.

Brands

Brands
 Highland Park single malt Scotch Whisky
The Glenrothes single malt Scotch Whisky
The Macallan single malt Scotch Whisky
The Famous Grouse blended Scotch Whisky
Naked Malt blended malt Scotch Whisky
No.3 London Dry Gin (via partnership with Berry Bros. & Rudd)
Wyoming Whiskey (Edrington Americas via partnership with Mead family )
Noble Oak bourbon (Edrington Americas)
Brugal rum

References

External links
Edrington website

Companies established in 1861
Manufacturing companies based in Glasgow
Food and drink companies based in Glasgow
Drink companies of Scotland
1865 establishments in Scotland
Drumchapel
Malt whisky